Klimenta is a surname. Notable people with the surname include:

Emrah Klimenta (born 1991), Montenegrin footballer
Tomáš Klimenta (born 1984), Czech ice hockey player 

Czech-language surnames
Montenegrin surnames
Slavic-language surnames